Petra Daňková (born March 18, 1984) is a Slovak women's ice hockey player. Currently, she is a member of Narmanspor team in Erzurum, Turkey playing as right winger.

Career

Club
Petra Daňková was with HC Slovan Bratislava and HK Poprad in her country before she transferred to the Erzurum-based Narmanspor in Turkey to play in the Turkish Women's Ice Hockey League (TBHBL). Her team finished the 2015–16 season as the runners-up.

International
Between 2004 and 2009, Daňková was a member of the Slovakia women's national ice hockey team capping 19 times. She took part at the 2004 IIHF Women's World Championship Div. II in Sterzing, Italy, 2007 WC Div. II in Pyongyang, North Korea, 2008 WC Div. I in Ventspils, Latvia and 2010 Winter Olympics – Women's qualification round matches in Liepāja, Latvia.

Honors

Club
Turkish Ice Hockey Women's League (TBHBL)
 Runners-up (1): 2015–16 with Narmanspor.

References

1984 births
Expatriate ice hockey players in Turkey
HC Lev Poprad players
HC Slovan Bratislava players
Living people
Narmanspor players
Place of birth missing (living people)
Slovak expatriate sportspeople in Turkey
Slovak women's ice hockey right wingers
Slovak expatriate ice hockey players in the Czech Republic
Slovak expatriate ice hockey players in Switzerland